Caldwell University is a private Catholic university in Caldwell, New Jersey. Founded in 1939 by the Sisters of St. Dominic, the university is accredited by the Middle States Commission on Higher Education, chartered by the State of New Jersey, and registered with the Regents of the University of the State of New York. Caldwell offers 25 undergraduate and 30 graduate programs, including doctoral, master's, certificate, and certification programs, as well as online and distance learning options.

History
In 2013, Caldwell College received approval for university status and changed its name to Caldwell University on July 1, 2014.

Campus
The university is located in suburban New Jersey, and it is about 20 miles from Manhattan.  It is on a seventy-acre campus along Essex County Route 506 (Bloomfield Avenue) and shares the land with the Sisters of St. Dominic's Caldwell convent and Mount Saint Dominic Academy, an all-girls Catholic high school. The Sisters also operate Saint Dominic Academy in nearby Jersey City and Lacordaire Academy in Upper Montclair.

Athletics
The Department of Athletics oversees all athletic programs at the university. Caldwell University teams participate as a member of the National Collegiate Athletic Association's Division II. The Cougars are a member of the Central Atlantic Collegiate Conference (CACC). In bowling, a women-only sport at the NCAA level in which a single national championship is contested for all three NCAA divisions, the Cougars are a single-sport member of the East Coast Conference.

In fall of 2019, Caldwell University will launch an eSports program as a member of the ECAC. The inaugural team will compete in the games of Overwatch and League of Legends. At the same time, Caldwell University will also launch a B.S. in e-Sports Management.

Men's sports
Baseball 
Basketball 
Cross country 
Lacrosse
Soccer
Sprint football
Track and field
Rugby

Women's sports
Basketball 
Bowling 
Cross country 
Lacrosse 
Soccer 
Softball 
Tennis 
Track and field 
Volleyball

Notable alumni

Alumni of Caldwell University include:
 Bill Brennan, activist and politician.
 Jane Burgio (1922–2005), politician who served as Secretary of State of New Jersey and as a member of the New Jersey General Assembly.
 Mary Jo Codey (born 1955), former First Lady of the State of New Jersey and wife of former Governor Richard Codey.
 Beth Fowler (born 1940), actress who appeared in numerous Broadway productions and Orange Is the New Black.
 Arline Friscia, politician who served as a member of the New Jersey General Assembly from 1996 to 2002, where she represented the 19th Legislative District.
 Mary Jo Kopechne (1940–1969), who drowned while riding as a passenger in a car driven by U.S. Senator Edward M. Kennedy. The circumstances of her drowning death at Chappaquiddick Island remain controversial, with her death regarded as a major hindrance to the Presidential aspirations of Kennedy.
 Billy McDonald, professional basketball player (Germany).
 Arthur Morrison, professional basketball player (Portugal).

References

External links
 Official website
 Official athletics website

 
The Caldwells, New Jersey
Universities and colleges in Essex County, New Jersey
Educational institutions established in 1939
Catholic universities and colleges in New Jersey
Dominican universities and colleges in the United States
1939 establishments in New Jersey
Association of Catholic Colleges and Universities
Former women's universities and colleges in the United States
Liberal arts colleges in New Jersey